Rupert or Ruppert is an English truncation of Latin Rupertus, which derives from Old High German Hruodoperht/Hruodoberht ('p' and 'b' are the voiceless and voiced cognates of the same consonant); which is also the source of the name Robert.  Thus, "Rupert" and "Robert" are different modern forms of the same name. The Old High German form of the name evolved from Germanic Hrothi, "fame, glory" + Berht, "bright"; thus, Rupert and Robert mean "fame bright".

Given name

A–P
 Saint Rupert of Bingen
 Rupert Boneham (born 1964), American multi-time Survivor contestant
 Rupert Brooke (1887–1915), English poet
 Rupert Bunny (1864–1947), Australian painter
 Rupert Cambridge, Viscount Trematon (1907–1928), great-grandson of Queen Victoria
 Rupert Carington, 4th Baron Carrington (1852–1929), English Liberal MP and soldier
 Rupert Carington, 5th Baron Carrington (1891–1938), English peer, father of Peter Carington, 6th Baron Carrington, former UK Foreign Secretary
 Rupert Carington, 7th Baron Carrington (born 1948), English businessman, son of Peter Carington, 6th Baron Carrington, former UK Foreign Secretary
 Rupert Cawthorne (1879–1965), English professional footballer 
 Rupert Davies (1916–1976), English actor
 Rupert Evans (born 1977), English actor
 Rupert Everett (born 1959), English actor
 Rupert Friend (born 1981), English actor
 Rupert Gould (1890-1948), lieutenant-commander in the British Royal Navy, scientist, author and radio personality
 Rupert Graves (born 1963), English actor
 Rupert Gregson-Williams, movie score composer
 Rupert Grint (born 1988), English actor
 Rupert Gwynne (1873–1924), English Conservative Party politician and MP
 Rupert Price Hallowes (1881–1915), World War I Victoria Cross recipient
 Rupert Hine (1947-2020), British Musician, Record Producer
 Rupert Holmes (born 1947), British-American composer, singer-songwriter, musician, dramatist and author.
 Rupert Jeffcoat (born 1970), Scottish musician
 Rupert Keegan (born 1955), English Formula One driver 
 Rupert, King of Germany (German: Ruprecht) (1352–1410), German King
 Blessed Rupert Mayer (1876–1945)
 Rupert Moon Welsh rugby international player
 Rupert Murdoch (born 1931), Australian-American media magnate
 Rupert Penry-Jones (born 1970), English actor
 Rupert Ponsonby, 7th Baron de Mauley (born 1957), British hereditary peer, Member of the House of Lords

R–S
 Prince Rupert of the Rhine (1619–1682), soldier, admiral, scientist, sportsman, colonial governor and amateur artist during the 17th century, one of the principal commanders of Wars of the Three Kingdoms, First English Civil War and Battle of Marston Moor
 Saint Rupert of Salzburg
 Rupert Richardson (1930-2008), American Civil Rights activist
 Rupert Sanders (born 1971), English film director
 Rupert Sandilands 1868–1946), English international footballer
 Rupert Scholz (born 1937), German politician who served as 9th Minister of Defence of Germany
 Rupert Sheldrake (born 1942), English professor, biologist and lecturer 
Rupert Shephard (1909–1992), English painter, illustrator and art teacher
Rupert Shoobridge (1883–1962), Australian politician
Rupert Shrive (born 1965), English artist
Rupert Simonian (born 1991), British actor with Canadian dual citizenship
Rupert Sloman (1890–1951), New Zealand cricketer
Rupert de Smidt (1883–1986), South African cricketer
Rupert Smith, KCB, DSO & Bar, OBE, QGM (born 1943), British Army officer, author of The Utility of Force
Rupert Smith (American football) (1897–1959), American football and baseball player
Rupert Smith (novelist), American-born English author
Rupert Soames OBE (born 1959), British businessman, CEO of the outsourcing company Serco
Rupert Speir (1910–1998), British Conservative Party politician and MP
Rupert Spira, English studio potter
Rupert Stadler (born 1963), German business executive and chairman of the Vorstand (CEO) of Audi AG
Charles Rupert Stockard (1879–1939), American anatomist and zoologist
Rupert Gordon Strutt (1912–1985), the Anglican Bishop of Stockport from 1965 to 1984
Rupert Max Stuart (1932–2014), Indigenous Australian convicted of murder in 1959
Rupert Svendsen-Cook (born 1990), British racing driver

T–Z
Rupert Taylor (born 1958), professor of political studies in Johannesburg
J. Rupert Thompson (born 1964), director and producer of reality television
Rupert Thomson FRSL (born 1955), English author
Rupert Thorneloe, MBE (1969–2009), British Army officer killed in action in Afghanistan
Timothy Rupert Thorogood (born 1962), Chief Executive of the Falkland Islands 2008–2012
Rupert von Trapp (1911–1992), eldest son of Georg von Trapp and his first wife, Agathe Whitehead von Trapp
Rupert Trimmingham (1899–1985), corporal in the United States Army Corps of Engineers during World War II
Wallace Rupert Turnbull (1870–1954), New Brunswick engineer and inventor
Rupert Vansittart (born 1958), English character actor
Rupert Wagner, German sprint canoeist
Rupert Wainwright (born 1961), English film and TV director, writer, and actor
Rupert Webb (1922–2018), English cricketer
Rupert Wegerif (born 1959), Professor of Education at the University of Exeter in England
Rupert Weinstabl (1911–1953), Austrian sprint canoeist
Rupert Mearse Wells (1835–1902), speaker of the Legislature of Ontario
Rupert Wells (rugby league), South African rugby league player
Rupert Wertheim (1893–1933), Australian tennis player
Rupert Whitaker (born 1963), psychiatrist, immunologist, patient-advocate
Rupert Wilson Wigmore, PC (1873–1939), Canadian politician
Rupert Wildt (1905–1976), German-American astronomer
Rupert Wilkinson (born 1938), British historian
Rupert Williamson (born 1945), furniture designer
Rupert Wills (born 1993), Australian rules footballer
Rupert Wingfield-Hayes (born 1967), British journalist
Rupert Worker (1896–1989), played first-class cricket in New Zealand
Rupert Wyatt (born 1972), English screenwriter, director, and producer
Rupert Young (born 1978), English actor

Surname
 The Rupert family, a billionaire family from Stellenbosch, South Africa or members of that family:
Anton Rupert (1916–2006)
Johann Rupert (born 1950), son of Anton Rupert
Bob Rupert (born 1931), former college basketball head coach
David Rupert (born 1951), former American FBI/British intelligence agent
Franke Rupert (1888–1971), Austrian graphic and engraver
G. G. Rupert (1847–1922), American Adventist pastor and writer
Jeff Rupert (born 1964), Yamaha performing artist, record producer, saxophonist, professor
Joe Rupert (1912–1996), American college football, basketball, and track athlete and coach
Michael Rupert (born 1951), American actor, singer, director and composer
Nura Rupert, Australian Aboriginal artist from north-west South Australia
Robert D. Rupert (born 1964), American philosopher and professor
Rona Rupert née Davel (1934–1995), South African author
Thierry Rupert (1977–2013), French basketball player
Wilhelm Ruppert, German Nazi SS officer and the third commandant of Warsaw concentration camp

Fictional characters
Rupert Baxter, fictional character in the Blandings stories by P. G. Wodehouse
 Rupert Bear, a cartoon bear created by Mary Tourtel
 Rupert of Hentzau, the villainous henchman of the king's usurper, Black Michael, in Anthony Hope's novels, The Prisoner of Zenda and Rupert of Hentzau
 Rupert, the squirrel in the 1950 Christmas film The Great Rupert
 Rupert Giles, watcher on the television series "Buffy the Vampire Slayer"
 Rupert Campbell-Black, the central character in the Rutshire Chronicles series by Jilly Cooper
Rupert Thorne, fictional character, a crime boss and enemy of Batman in the DC Comics universe
 Rupert T. Waxflatter, the mentor of the future detective Sherlock Holmes, created for the 1985 film Young Sherlock Holmes
 Rupert Pupkin, the anti-hero in the 1983 film The King of Comedy
 Rupert Campion, the son of the gentleman detective Albert Campion in Margery Allingham's eponymous series
Rupert, stuffed teddy bear owned by cartoon character Stewie Griffin (Family Guy)
 Rupert, one of the narrator’s aliases in the 1999 film Fight Club.
 Rupert, Prince of the West and protagonist of Gimlet Media's The Two Princes
 Sir Rupert Murgatroyd, from Gilbert and Sullivan's Ruddigore
 Dr. Jacques von Hämsterviel, the alien main antagonist of Disney's Lilo & Stitch franchise; his real given name was revealed to be "Rupert" in the Lilo & Stitch: The Series episode "Nosy"

See also
 Ruppert, given name and surname

English given names
English masculine given names
Surnames from given names